Mortezaabad may refer to:
 Mortezaabad, Kerman
 Mortezaabad, Khuzestan
 Mortezaabad, Qazvin

See also
 Murtazaabad, Pakistan